Ryan Suter (born January 21, 1985) is an American professional ice hockey defenseman for the Dallas Stars of the National Hockey League (NHL). He has previously played for the Nashville Predators and Minnesota Wild.

Suter's father, Bob Suter, was a member of the historic gold medal-winning 1980 United States Olympic hockey team that defeated the Soviet Union in the famous "Miracle on Ice" game. Suter's uncle Gary Suter was also a longtime standout in the NHL. Suter was alternate captain for the U.S. national team at the 2010 Winter Olympics, earning a silver medal.

Playing career

Nashville Predators (2005–2012)

Suter played for the Madison Capitols, Culver Military Academy and then went on to the USA Hockey's National Development Team in Ann Arbor, Michigan, before he was drafted seventh overall by the Nashville Predators in the 2003 NHL Entry Draft. He then played one year with the Wisconsin Badgers (Western Collegiate Hockey Association in NCAA Division I) before joining the Milwaukee Admirals of the American Hockey League (AHL) during the 2004–05 season. He played his rookie season in the NHL with the Predators in 2005–06.

On June 16, 2008, Suter signed a four-year, $14 million contract extension with the Predators which commenced for the 2008–09 NHL season.

Minnesota Wild (2012–2021)

On July 4, 2012, Suter signed a 13-year, $98 million contract with the Minnesota Wild. He and fellow free agent signee Zach Parise were introduced to the media on July 10 and were announced as alternate captains under captain Mikko Koivu. Suter got off to a rough start with a –7 plus-minus rating in his first nine games. However, once he began pairing with rookie defenseman Jonas Brodin, Suter began playing to expectations and was among three finalists for the James Norris Memorial Trophy, awarded yearly to the NHL's top defenseman. For the season, Suter averaged an NHL-leading 27:17 minutes of ice time as Minnesota reached the playoffs, where the team fell to the Chicago Blackhawks in the first round.

Suter scored his first NHL hat-trick on January 4, 2014, against the Washington Capitals; his first two goals came on the power play 38 seconds apart in the second period, and in the third period, right after his penalty expired, Suter scored his third goal on a two-on-one with defenseman Clayton Stoner. This goal sealed what would eventually be a 5–3 victory for the Wild.

During the 2015–16 season, Suter set a franchise record for the Minnesota Wild with the most points by a defenseman in a single season. With 43 assists and 51 points, he also set a personal best in both categories. Throughout his tenure with the Wild, he has continuously been relied upon to play a large number of minutes including on the power play and on the penalty kill.

On October 19, 2018, in a 3–1 win against the Dallas Stars, Suter recorded his 500th NHL point, becoming the 11th American-born defensemen to reach the milestone. Later that month, on October 25, Suter played in his 1,000th NHL game, becoming the 109th defenseman to reach the milestone.

On July 13, 2021, the Wild bought out the remaining four years of Suter's contract.

Dallas Stars (2021–present)
On July 28, 2021, the opening day of free agency, Suter agreed to sign a four-year, $14.6 million contract to join the Dallas Stars.

International play

Suter has represented the United States in eleven tournaments, and has won three gold medals.

On January 1, 2010, Suter was named to the United States' roster for the 2010 Winter Olympics. He was one of the team's alternate captains.

In 2016, he was also selected to represent the United States at the 2016 World Cup of Hockey alongside Wild teammate, Zach Parise.

On April 19, 2019, Suter returned to the International stage for the first time in three years as he accepted an invitation to represent Team USA at the 2019 IIHF World Championship, held in Bratislava and Kosice, Slovakia.

In 2020, Suter was introduced into the IIHF All-Time USA Team.

Personal life
Suter resides in Madison, Wisconsin, during the NHL off-season. He is married to Becky Suter (née Palmer), who is from Bloomington, Minnesota. Ryan and Becky have four children together. His uncle is Gary Suter. Ryan's father, Bob Suter, member of the Miracle on Ice U.S. hockey team in the 1980 Winter Olympics, died September 9, 2014.

Career statistics

Regular season and playoffs

International

Awards and honors

See also
Notable families in the NHL

References

External links

1985 births
Living people
American men's ice hockey defensemen
Culver Academies alumni
Dallas Stars players
Sportspeople from Madison, Wisconsin
Ice hockey players from Wisconsin
Ice hockey players at the 2010 Winter Olympics
Ice hockey players at the 2014 Winter Olympics
Medalists at the 2010 Winter Olympics
Milwaukee Admirals players
Minnesota Wild players
Nashville Predators draft picks
Nashville Predators players
National Hockey League All-Stars
National Hockey League first-round draft picks
Olympic silver medalists for the United States in ice hockey
Wisconsin Badgers men's ice hockey players